Krumlov may refer to:

Český Krumlov, a town in South Bohemia, Czech Republic
Duchy of Krumlov, a titular duchy of the Bohemia
Moravský Krumlov, a town in South Moravia, Czech Republic